Provincial Trunk Highway 59 (PTH 59) is a major provincial highway in the Canadian province of Manitoba.

Route description
PTH 59 is a four-lane at-grade expressway from Provincial Road 210 south of Île-des-Chênes, through Winnipeg, to the Brokenhead Ojibway Nation, except for a two-kilometre section of six-lane road between the North Perimeter Highway (PTH 101) and Provincial Road 202.  The remainder of PTH 59 is a two-lane highway except within the communities of St. Pierre-Jolys and St. Malo.

PTH 59 coincides with City Route 20 (Lagimodière Boulevard) as it runs through the eastern part of the Winnipeg.  North of the city, PTH 59 is the main route to Grand Beach and the eastern side of Lake Winnipeg and part of the La Vérendrye Trail.  To the south, PTH 59 is effectively the modern-day successor to the original Crow Wing Trail as one of two main roads between Winnipeg and the United States border, serving as an alternative to PTH 75.  PTH 59 is also a main route on both sides of Winnipeg for rural Manitobans commuting to work in the city.

Major intersections

See also

Winnipeg Route 20
Crow Wing Trail

References

059
Manitoba 059